The 1900 class railcars are a class of self-propelled railcars built by Commonwealth Engineering, Granville for the Queensland Railways in 1956.

History
In 1956 two 1900 class railmotor prototypes were constructed by Commonwealth Engineering, Granville using Budd construction techniques. The railmotors suffered from continuous gearbox problems and Queensland Railways elected to purchase 2000 class rail motors instead.

RM1900 was stripped down for an overhaul in the mid 1980s but the work didn't proceed and it was scrapped in August 1988.

RM1901 is retained by Queensland Rail as part of its Heritage Fleet. It is used for heritage tours and occasionally used for track inspections. When not required for use it is stored at the Workshops Rail Museum, North Ipswich.

Gallery

References

External links
Great Trains gallery

Railcars of Queensland